Humayun Khan (31 August 1932 – 22 September 2022) was a Pakistani politician and diplomat who served as Foreign Secretary, and as High Commissioner to India and the United Kingdom.  He was serving as the Chairman of the Institute of Rural Management (IRM).

References

External links
Biodata of Dr Humayun Khan
Diplomatic Stumps Beyond The Cricket Pitch

1932 births
2022 deaths
Pashtun people
People from Mardan District
Ambassadors of Pakistan to Russia
Foreign Secretaries of Pakistan
High Commissioners of Pakistan to Bangladesh
High Commissioners of Pakistan to India
High Commissioners of Pakistan to the United Kingdom